White Chimneys is a historic home located at Salisbury Township, Lancaster County, Pennsylvania. A large white mansion directly adjacent to U.S. Route 30, the premises were listed on The National Register of Historic Places in 1975.

History

Originally begun between 1710 and 1720 as the Francis Jones Tavern, the house was the residence of the Slaymaker family between 1779 and 1999. It is a -story, five-bay building of stuccoed limestone. It is topped by a gable roof with dormers and was built in four phases, the 1710-20 log cabin, a two-room addition in 1790, a large Federal style addition in  1807 and the west wing addition in 1923, which includes a ballroom. The mansion and its environs were a significant landmark in the Pequea Valley of the 17-1800s. The house's status as a prominent marker on the Philadelphia and Lancaster Turnpike made it suitable as a stop on the Visit of the Marquis de Lafayette to the United States in 1825. Throughout the 1960s and 1970s, parts of the house were opened as a museum and roadside attraction. 
White Chimneys has a long history as the setting of Ghost stories, with residents reporting unexplained smells, sounds and apparitions.

Current Use

The house continues to be maintained as a private residence. The grounds and formal gardens are open to the public by appointment. In most recent years, the property has gained popularity as an elegant wedding ceremony and reception venue. The bank barn and pastures are utilized for horses.

References

External links
 White Chimneys website

Houses on the National Register of Historic Places in Pennsylvania
Federal architecture in Pennsylvania
Houses completed in 1923
Houses in Lancaster County, Pennsylvania
National Register of Historic Places in Lancaster County, Pennsylvania